Kungsbacka IF is a Swedish football club located in Kungsbacka.

Background
Kungsbacka IF currently plays in Division 4 Halland Elit which is the sixth tier of Swedish football. They play their home matches at the Tingbergsvallen in Kungsbacka.

The club is affiliated to Hallands Fotbollförbund. Kungsbacka BI/Kungsbacka IF have competed in the Svenska Cupen on 24 occasions and have played 60 matches in the competition.

Season to season

* * The club was known as Kungsbacka BI until 2005.

Footnotes

External links
 Kungsbacka IF – Official website
 Kungsbacka IF on Facebook

Sport in Halland County
Football clubs in Halland County
Association football clubs established in 2005
2005 establishments in Sweden